Instituto del Petróleo metro station is a Mexico City Metro transfer station in Gustavo A. Madero, Mexico City. It is a combined underground and at-grade station with two side platforms each, along Lines 5 (the Yellow Line) and 6 (the Red Line). Instituto del Petróleo metro station is located between Politécnico and Autobuses del Norte stations on Line 5, and between Vallejo and Lindavista stations on Line 6. It serves the colonias (neighborhoods) of Valle del Tepeyac, San Bartolo Atepehuacan, and Nueva Industrial. The station's pictogram depicts an oil derrick, and its name is on account of its proximity to the Mexican Petroleum Institute headquarters.

Instituto del Petróleo metro station opened on 30 August 1982 with service on Line 5 northward toward Politécnico. West service on Line 6 toward El Rosario started on 21 December 1983. Inside the station, there is a collection of sculptures titled Petróleo, made of oil drums and created by Mexican artist Ernesto Paulsen Camba. In 2019, the station had an overall average daily ridership of 9,309 passengers.

Location

Instituto del Petróleo is a metro transfer station in the Gustavo A. Madero borough, in northern Mexico City. The station lies along Eje Central (in the section formerly known as 100 Metros Avenue), and serves colonias (Mexican Spanish for "neighborhoods") of Valle del Tepeyac, San Bartolo Atepehuacan, and Nueva Industrial. Within the system, it lies between Politécnico and Autobuses del Norte stations on Line 5; on Line 6, between Vallejo and Lindavista stations. The area is serviced by Line 6 of the Metrobús system at Instituto del Petróleo station, a few blocks away; by Line 1 and 8 (formerly Lines A and CP, respectively) of the trolleybus system, and by Routes 23 and 103 of the Red de Transporte de Pasajeros network.

Exits
There are six exits:
Northeast: Eje Central (100 Metros Avenue) and Masagua Street, Valle del Tepeyac (Line 5).
Northwest: Eje Central and Masagua Street, Valle del Tepeyac (Line 5).
Southeast: Eje Central and Otavalo Street, San Bartolo Atepehuacan (Line 6).
Southwest: Eje Central and Poniente 128 Street, San Bartolo Atepehuacan (Line 6).
North: Poniente 134 Street, Nueva Industrial (Line 6).
South: Poniente 134 Street, Nueva Industrial (Line 6).

Landmarks
Inside Instituto del Petróleo metro station, there are seven sculptures specifically created for the station. The collection, made of wrought iron oil drums, is named Petróleo (1986) and was created by Mexican sculptor Ernesto Paulsen Camba.

History and construction

The Line 5 station was built at grade by Cometro, a subsidiary of Empresas ICA; Instituto del Petróleo Line 5 opened on 30 August 1982, on the first day of the Politécnico–Pantitlán service. In June 2006, Metro authorities replaced the railroad switches; in 2008, they gave maintenance to the station's roof.

The Line 6 station was built underground by Cometro; the Vallejo–Instituto del Petróleo interstation tunnel is 755 m (2,477 ft) long, while the Instituto del Petróleo–Lindavista tunnel measures 1,258 m (4,147 ft). Instituto del Petróleo Line 6 opened on 21 December 1983, on the first day of the El Rosario–Instituto del Petróleo service. On 8 July 1986, the service toward Martín Carrera started.

The station's pictogram depicts an oil derrick and its name references the Mexican Petroleum Institute, whose headquarters are in the zone; there is an Internet café inside the facilities.

Incidents
On 19 July 2018, a 16-year-old man was stabbed with a pair of scissors by a 40-year-old man on the station platforms. The injury did not warrant hospitalization and the aggressor was referred to the Public Prosecutor's Office. On 8 November 2020, Instituto del Petróleo, Politécnico, and Lindavista stations were vandalized during feminist demonstrations; walls, screens, handrails, a train, and a mural were damaged and graffitied.

Ridership
According to the data provided by the authorities since the 2000s, Instituto del Petróleo metro station has been one of the least busy stations of the system's 195 stations. In the last decade, commuters averaged per year between 4,700 and 7,500 daily entrances on Line 5 and between 2,900 and 4,800 daily entrances on Line 6. In 2019, before the impact of the COVID-19 pandemic on public transport, the station's ridership totaled 3,398,142 passengers. For Line 5, the ridership was 2,215,325 passengers (6,069 per day), which was an increase of 40,310 passengers compared to 2018. For Line 6, the station had a ridership of 1,182,817 passengers (3,240 per day), which was a decrease of 40,176 passengers compared to 2018.

In 2019, the Line 5 station was the 180th busiest of the system and the line's 10th busiest. The Line 6 station was the 193rd busiest in the system and the line's second-least used.

Notes

References

External links

1982 establishments in Mexico
1983 establishments in Mexico
Mexico City Metro Line 5 stations
Mexico City Metro Line 6 stations
Mexico City Metro stations in Gustavo A. Madero, Mexico City
Railway stations located underground in Mexico
Railway stations opened in 1982
Railway stations opened in 1983